The Little Tease is a 1913 silent black and white film directed by D. W. Griffith, produced by Biograph Company and starring Henry B. Walthall and Mae Marsh.

Cast

See also
D. W. Griffith filmography
Lionel Barrymore filmography
Lillian Gish filmography

References

External links
 

American silent films
American black-and-white films
Films directed by D. W. Griffith
Films with screenplays by D. W. Griffith
Films shot in California
Biograph Company films
General Film Company
1910s American films